Karol Piltz (1903–1939) was a Polish chess master.

He played for Poland in the 1st unofficial Chess Olympiad at Paris 1924, tied for 3rd-7th in the 1st Polish Chess Championship at Warsaw 1926 (Dawid Przepiórka won), and tied for 17-18th at Jurata 1937 (4th POL-ch, Savielly Tartakower won).

Piltz, along with other members of the Warsaw team (Abram Blass, Rafał Feinmesser, Paulin Frydman, Stanisław Kohn, Leon Kremer, Henryk Pogorieły) won a gold medal in the 1st Polish Team Championship at Królewska Huta 1929.

He died during the Siege of Warsaw in September 1939 during World War II.

References

1903 births
1939 deaths
Polish chess players
Sportspeople from Warsaw
20th-century chess players
Polish military personnel killed in World War II